Labdia macrobela is a moth in the family Cosmopterigidae. It was described by Edward Meyrick in 1918. It is known from Mozambique.

References

Endemic fauna of Mozambique
Labdia
Moths described in 1918
Moths of Sub-Saharan Africa
Lepidoptera of Mozambique